Eshrat Kordestani (born 02 January 1984) is an Iranian Paralympian in Sitting volleyball. She originally competed in volleyball before she lost her foot in an anti-personnel mine accident in 2002. The Iranian women's sitting volleyball team won silver at the 2014 Incheon, when she was captain. The team also qualified to compete at the 2016 Summer Paralympics for the first time. She was the captain of the Iranian women's sitting volleyball team and also the flag-bearer for Iran in Rio 2016.

Personal life 
Kordestani has been war wounded and lost her right foot in Shalamcheh in 2002 when she was 19 years old, hitting an Anti-personnel mine as a leftover from the Iran-Iraq war. She then started sitting volleyball after being paralyzed, following her volleyball career.

Honors 
Captain of the Iran women's sitting volleyball team to first ever qualify for the Paralympics in Rio de Janeiro 2016.
The Flagbearer for Iran in Rio 2016 paralympics.
Top scorer for Iran team

See also
List of athletes who have competed in the Paralympics and Olympics

References 

1984 births
Living people
People from Kerman
Volleyball players at the 2016 Summer Paralympics
Paralympic volleyball players of Iran
Iranian sitting volleyball players
People from Kerman Province